The 1983 America's Cup was a 12-metre class yacht race which pitted the defending New York Yacht Club's Liberty against the Royal Perth Yacht Club's challenger, Australia II.  The  September 1983 match race was won by Australia II in the first successful challenge of the New York Yacht Club's 132-year defense of the Cup. The Australian syndicate's boat, skippered by John Bertrand, fought back from a 3–1 deficit to best the Dennis Conner-helmed defender, ending both the longest winning streak in sporting history and U.S. domination of the racing series.

The defender: Liberty
Liberty won all the Defender trials and on 2 September 1983, the New York Yacht Club confirmed that Liberty was to represent the club as defender of the America's Cup.

The crew included team principal Dennis Conner as skipper, Tom Whidden, navigator Halsey Chase Herreshoff, Scott Vogel, and mainsheet trimmer John Marshall.

During the summer preceding the trials Conner had been the focus of extensive media attention in the U.S., including an appearance on the cover of Sports Illustrated magazine, a rare recognition for a sailor.

Liberty had competed with John Kolius' Courageous, and Tom Blackaller's Defender (sail no. US–33), in a defender series before being selected by the New York Yacht Club. Gary Jobson was the founder and tactician of the Courageous/Defender syndicate.

The challenger: Australia II

Alan Bond arrived at Newport with Australia II, billed as one of the biggest threats to American dominance of the 12 Metre class. The boat was designed by Ben Lexcen and skippered by John Bertrand. The revolutionary "winged keel" of the Australian yacht was a subject of controversy from the outset of the challenger series, with the New York Yacht club alleging that the winged keel boat was not a legal 12 Meter, and that the keel design itself was the result of Dutch engineers, and not by Lexcen. This second point would have made Australia II illegal under the requirement that the boat be "designed and constructed in country" as the Deed of Gift that governed the competition stipulated. The boat was ruled a legal 12 Meter, and she was allowed to participate in the regatta. The speed of the new contender, along with the controversy and protests intensified international media attention to the series.

Australia II dominated the challenger series and entered the America's Cup finals as the most promising contender to date.

The races
The U.S. yacht won the first and second races by margins of more than a minute when the Australian yacht suffered equipment failure, but the Australia II took the third race, and came back to win the fifth and sixth races after Liberty won the fourth. This was the first time the America's Cup had needed a sixth race, let alone a seventh.

The cup title came down to the seventh and final race. For the seventh and deciding race on 26 September 1983 the wind was light at around eight knots. The pre-start was not a typical match race start. "Neither party wanted to make a mistake and end up in the protest room," Conner would explain later. Liberty won the start by eight seconds ahead of Australia II on paper but the Australians held a controlling position at the favoured end sailing toward the favoured side which gave them the early lead. Australia II was subsequently overtaken by Conner who built up what seemed to be an unassailable margin. At the start of the penultimate leg (a square run) the America's Cup looked like it would stay in Newport. Conner failed to cover Australia II which allowed them to run deeper and faster assisted by breeze and windshifts allowing Australia II to overtake the Americans by the leeward mark. Conner then engaged Australia II in a spectacular tacking duel with nearly 50 tacks including a number of faked "dummy" tacks trying to break the Australians' cover. Australia II held on until both boats reached the starboard layline in amongst the spectator fleet and tacked several boat lengths ahead of Liberty and sailed to the finish to take the race. Australia II crossed the finish line with a winning margin of 41 seconds, becoming the first successful challenger in the 132 years "since the schooner America won it in a race around England's Isle of Wight in 1851".

Aftermath
The final race was televised in Australia in the early hours of 27 September 1983 (Australian time) just before dawn, and the victory was celebrated in public venues across Australia. Prime Minister Bob Hawke was interviewed at the dawn celebration at Royal Perth Yacht Club, Western Australia. After humorously fending off repeated questioning by journalists about whether he would declare a public holiday he admitted this was a state matter and outside his power as Prime Minister. He joked that he thought it should be and that any state Premiers who disagreed with him might "find themselves in a spot of bother". To rapturous laughter and applause, he said with finality: "Any boss who sacks a worker for not turning up today is a bum".

In stark contrast to Australia, the loss of the 1983 America's Cup was considered a time of shame in U.S. sailing, as the U.S. had been able to defend the Cup for 132 years in a row. Dennis Conner took the loss hard. Asked about how he felt initially after losing the Cup, Conner said: "It was awful. I just did not want to get out of bed in the morning. I am usually full of life and energy... I just wanted to hide".

The America's Cup was transferred from the New York Yacht Club to the Royal Perth Yacht Club located in Perth, Western Australia, which subsequently hosted its first, but unsuccessful, defense in the 1987 America's Cup. After losing the Cup, the U.S. had been determined to bring it back. Conner went to work on the next US America's Cup Campaign. With the help of designers Britton Chance, Jr., Bruce Nelson and David Pedrick, the boat Stars and Stripes 87 was created which, after progressively gaining speed in a grueling challenger series, became the 1987 challenger. Stars and Stripes sailed against Kookaburra, the Australian defender, with Conner winning the 1987 America's Cup and returning it to the U.S. The 1992 film Wind portrays in large part the loss of the 1983 Cup and the journey to regain it at the 1987 Challenge. While parts of the film take some creative license with the actual events, Wind has generally been acclaimed as the single most accurate and realistic sailing film ever made, capturing not only the technical and physical challenges of sailing, but also the realistic and daily culture and lifestyle of professional yachtsmen and yachtswomen.

In retrospect, Conner said that losing the Cup in 1983 had been good for the sport of sailing and the Cup itself: 
"Me losing after 132 years was the best thing that ever happened to the America's Cup and the best thing that ever happened to Dennis Conner...Before the win by the Australians, the America's Cup was only big in the minds of the yachties, but the rest of the world didn't know or care about it at all. But when we lost it... it was a little bit like losing the Panama Canal - suddenly everyone appreciated it. If I hadn't lost it, there never would have been the national effort... without that there never would have been the ticker-tape parade up Fifth Avenue in New York, lunch with the President at the White House and all the doors of opportunity that it opened".

References

Further reading
 Akerman, Piers. (1983) The cup comes down under Perth, W.A.: Angus & Robertson,
 The official Advance Australia Souvenir, America's cup 1983. Sydney: Amalgamated Pub. 
 Boyd, Jeff & Hunter, Doug (1984) Trials: Canada I and the 1983 America's Cup  
Levitt, Michael & Llloyd, Barbara (1984) Upset : Australia wins the America's Cup color photography by Dan Nerney. Sydney: Hodder and Stoughton,  (First published: New York: Workman Publishing, 1983).
 Moult, Allan (compiler) The America's Cup '83 Collector's edition. McMahon's Point, N.S.W.: Kevin Weldon & Associates
 Panorama Books (1983) How we won the America's Cup : a souvenir. Perth, W.A. : Panorama Books.  (ANB/PRECIS SIN 0705837)
 Park, Andy (editor) Stannard, Bruce (text) (1984) Australia II : the official record Sydney: Joyce Childress Management. 
 Stannard, Bruce (1983)The triumph of Australia II : the America's Cup challenge of 1983  Sydney: Lansdowne Press. 
 Todd, Nigel and Ross, Brian (1983) America's Cup '83 : the official Advance Australia edition Manly, N.S.W.: Sea Spray. 
 Westley, Eileen (1983) America's Cup '83, the complete story. Sydney: John Fairfax Marketing. 
 Wheatley, Keith (1986) America's Cup '87: the inside story. Ringwood, Vic.: Penguin Books. 
 Wilson, Lorraine.(1984) The America's Cup 1983 illustrated by Alex Stitt. Melbourne : Nelson.

External links
 Alan Bond and John Bertrand at America's Cup celebrations, The Esplanade, Perth
  Australia II  KA 6

 
1983
America's Cup
America's Cup
America's Cup
12-metre class
September 1983 sports events in the United States